The year 1817 in science and technology involved some significant events, listed below.

Biology
 Georges Cuvier publishes Le Règne Animal.

Chemistry
 Discovery of cadmium by Friedrich Stromeyer.
 Discovery of lithium by Johann Arfvedson.
 Discovery of selenium by Jöns Jakob Berzelius.
 Pierre-Joseph Pelletier and Joseph Bienaimé Caventou isolate chlorophyll and emetine.
 Leopold Gmelin begins publication of his Handbuch der theoretischen Chemie.

Medicine
 First cholera pandemic (1817–24) originates in Bengal, reaching Calcutta by September.
 James Parkinson publishes An Essay on the Shaking Palsy, describing "paralysis agitans", the condition which will become known as Parkinson's disease.

Technology
 March – Ackermann steering geometry invented by Georg Lankensperger.
 June 12 – German inventor Karl Drais drives his dandy horse ("Draisine" or Laufmaschine), the earliest form of bicycle, in Mannheim.
 July 10 – David Brewster patents the kaleidoscope.

Institutions
 October 1 – Philomaths established secretly by Poles at the Imperial University of Vilnius.

Awards
 Copley Medal: Henry Kater

Births
 January 29 – William Ferrel (died 1891), American meteorologist.
 February 15 – Robert Angus Smith (died 1884), Scottish-born atmospheric chemist.
 April 8 – Charles-Édouard Brown-Séquard (died 1894), Mauritian-born physiologist and neurologist.
 May 31 – Joseph Marie Élisabeth Durocher (died 1860), French geologist.
 June 30 – Joseph Dalton Hooker (died 1911), English botanist.
 July 5 – Carl Vogt (died 1895), German scientist who publishes notable works in zoology, geology and physiology.
 July 15 – John Fowler (died 1898), English civil engineer.
 September 10 – Richard Spruce (died 1893), English botanist.
 October 10 – C. H. D. Buys Ballot (died 1890), Dutch meteorologist.
 October 17 – Alfred Des Cloizeaux (died 1897), French mineralogist.
 November 26 – Charles-Adolphe Wurtz (died 1884), Alsatian French chemist.
 December 13 – Arthur Hill Hassall (died 1894), English physician, microbiologist and chemical analyst.
 December 14 – Sophia Wilkens (died 1889), Swedish pioneer in the education of students with intellectual disability.

Deaths
 January 1 – Martin Heinrich Klaproth (born 1743), German chemist.
 April 12 – Charles Messier (born 1730), French astronomer.
 May 12 – William Goforth (born 1766), American physician and paleontologist.
 June 2 – Clotilde Tambroni, Italian philologist and linguist (born 1758)
 June 11 – William Gregor (born 1761), Cornish mineralogist.
 July 28 – Abraham Gottlob Werner (born 1749), German geologist.
 August 7 – Pierre Samuel du Pont de Nemours (born 1739), French-born American industrialist.
 September 18 – William Charles Wells (born 1757), American physician.
 November 7 – Jean-André Deluc (born 1727), Swiss geologist.
 December 15 – Abate Giovanni Battista Guglielmini (born 1763), Bolognese physicist.

References

 
19th century in science
1810s in science